Sitting volleyball at the 2022 ASEAN Para Games was held between 30 July until 6 August 2021 at the  Tunas Pembangunan University (UTP) Sports Hall, Karanganyar, Central Java.

Medal summary

Medalists

Men's tournament

Group A

Group B

Knockout stage

Bracket

Women's tournament

Group 1

References

2022 ASEAN Para Games
Sitting volleyball at the ASEAN Para Games